Ratu Isikeli Tuiwailevu is a Fijian politician and member of the Parliament of Fiji. He is a member of the People's Alliance.

He was selected as a PA candidate in the 2022 Fijian general election, and was elected to Parliament, winning 3061 votes.

References

Living people
Fijian chiefs
People's Alliance (Fiji) politicians
Members of the Parliament of Fiji
Year of birth missing (living people)